The Ötztaler Ache is a river in the district of Imst, Tyrol, Austria, a right tributary of the Inn. It flows through the Ötztal valley, a southern branch the Inntal. The river is one of its bigger tributaries.

Gallery

References

Rivers of Tyrol (state)
Rivers of Austria